Torrent is a 1926 American silent romantic drama film directed by an uncredited Monta Bell, based on a novel by Vicente Blasco Ibáñez, and released on February 21, 1926.

Torrent was the first American film starring Swedish actress Greta Garbo. The film also starred Ricardo Cortez and Martha Mattox.

The title refers to a flood that occurs in the small town where most of the action takes place, which draws the two romantic leading characters closer together.

Plot summary

Cast

Reception 
MGM was uncertain about how to cast Garbo after her arrival in Hollywood. In Torrent,  her first American film, she was cast as Leonora, a Spanish peasant girl, and MGM was pleased with the results.
Variety reviewed the film and described Garbo in her debut as " a girl with everything, looks, acting ability and personality". The film grossed $460,000 in the USA and $208,000 internationally, it grossed $668,000 worldwide, netting a $126,000 profit for MGM. Louis B. Mayer's initial instinct about the actress's ability paid off, and the film was a success. Torrent was released on DVD in 2011 as part of the Warner Archive Collection.

References

External links 

 
 
 
 
 Classic Film Guide
 Cine Web

1926 films
American silent feature films
American romantic drama films
American black-and-white films
Metro-Goldwyn-Mayer films
Films based on works by Vicente Blasco Ibáñez
Films directed by Monta Bell
Films set in Spain 
Films produced by Irving Thalberg
1926 romantic drama films
1920s American films
Silent romantic drama films
Silent American drama films